Unpaid labor or unpaid work is defined as labor or work that does not receive any direct remuneration. This is a form of non-market work which can fall into one of two categories: (1) unpaid work that is placed within the production boundary of the System of National Accounts (SNA), such as gross domestic product (GDP); and (2) unpaid work that falls outside of the production boundary (non-SNA work), such as domestic labor that occurs inside households for their consumption. Unpaid labor is visible in many forms and isn't limited to activities within a household. Other types of unpaid labor activities include volunteering as a form of charity work and interning as a form of unpaid employment. In a lot of countries, unpaid domestic work in the household is typically performed by women, due to gender inequality and gender norms, which can result in high-stress levels in Women attempting to balance unpaid work and paid employment. In poorer countries, this work is sometimes performed by children.

Production boundary
The production boundary is the name given by economists to the imaginary line between unpaid work, which is not counted directly in the gross domestic product, and paid work that the GDP does count. Production boundary includes goods or services that are supplied to units other producers, including the production of goods or services used up in the process of producing such goods or services; and the "own-account production of housing services by owner-occupiers and of domestic and personal services produced by employing paid domestic staff", according to the 2001 OECD Economist Diane Coyle described how the digital revolution and the COVID-19 pandemic has increased debates on establishing the production boundary, which involves measuring 'true' productivity. Millions of volunteer hours of unpaid work contribute to free services that others consume via social media and Wikipedia in a new parallel economy.  This unpaid work contributes a real monetary value to the digital platforms' owners that is included in the GDP, while all the unpaid work is on the wrong side of the production boundary and is therefore not counted.

Types

Unpaid care work 

"Unpaid care work" typically specifically contains everyday activities, such as self construction, self repairing, home tech shopping, barbacuing, vacations planning, child amusing,  cooking, washing, cleaning, shopping for own household, as well as care of children, the elderly, the sick, and the disabled. The term "unpaid care work" is primarily defined as care work for family members, but it is important to note that other types of unpaid SNA work exist that address 'productive activities', which include types of labor such as "growing food for own consumption, and collecting water and fuel".

Reproductive labor 
While unpaid care work is not completely biological, reproductive labor (partially) is. Debra Satz believes that reproductive labor is "a special kind of labor that should not be treated according to market norms"; it includes childbearing and raising/taking care of children and other family members. Childbearing is an act that only those who possess female reproductive organs can perform, making it irreversibly a biological-female's job. Married women, single mothers, or other female family members (such as elder siblings, aunts, etc.) are expected to be the primary actors of this unpaid reproductive labor in their personal lives, on top of the economic necessity of entering the productive, paid labor force. Child-rearing falls under both reproductive and care labor, so, after breastfeeding, any member of the household can take on the job.

History 
The role of women and men within their households is deeply rooted in gender norms and cultural values that have been reinforced over time by colonization and imperialism. For example, as seen in Patricia Grimshaw's research in Hawaii: New England missionaries assumed the roles of imperialists and colonialists by preaching their Christian values to the native Hawaiian population, who, before the missionary women arrived, practiced polygamy (high class-status allowing) and did not trouble themselves with domestic tasks like ironing. The Christian women, in particular, saw it as their responsibility to teach the native women notions of femininity that consisted of remaining inside the home to care for the family and to remain submissive to their husbands. Historically, a woman's position in the home was seen as a  prerequisite to being a "good" wife and mother. Since the 1960s, however, the spread of globalization has given rise to new opportunities for women to participate in market work that has challenged the assumption their primary adult role as that of caretaker for the family and home.

The spread of globalization has created more opportunities for women to enter paid employment, but has not relieved them of their time spent on unpaid labor. While participating in the labor market, women who secure paid employment undertake what is known as the "double burden" of labor. Finding the optimal balance of paid and unpaid labor, or work-life balance, is a constant struggle for women trying to create careers for themselves while raising children or caring for elderly family members. Women have to constantly decide where to allocate time and financial resources, which impacts their ability to develop their own capabilities. In turn, this decision impacts their family's relative standard of living as measured by national income accounting statistics.

Because of social norms and expectations, the burden of unpaid work primarily falls on the female member(s) of the household. Even if the male member(s) of the household are available to perform the care labor after they return home from their paid job, it is more often seen that the women are taking on the bulk of the care labor after they return home.

The traditional view of a family involves a woman in unpaid domestic labor supporting the household; however, under trends of dual earner couples and a gradually aging population, the commercialization of housework and domestic care has become inevitable. Arguments have been made that the value of unpaid domestic labor must always be considered to prevent the exploitation of unpaid workers, and thus should be seen as legitimate employment. There are also arguments that a "caregiver allowance" should be provided to unpaid domestic workers to protect the labor value of their work.

Regardless of the methodology used, a variety of studies have shown that the division of household labor results in a disproportionate burden falling on the wives in married couples' households. While this is the case, it has also been shown that the disparity between men and women in married households has been shrinking to some degree. For example, during the Great Recession of the 2000s, low income men increased their contributions to their households by completing more hours of unpaid domestic work.

The "feminine quality" of unpaid care work 

Globally, the expectation of women being the main providers of 'unpaid care' labor has been socially constructed and enforced by gender norms. Even when women are employed full-time outside the house, they may perform a greater share of household chores and childcare activities. As a result of globalization, women have increasingly been expected to take on jobs in both the paid and unpaid sectors, contributing to family income while still being the main providers of unpaid labor. This inequality emphasizes the gender division of labor and how it has changed with globalization's shifts in employment patterns. Furthermore, it illuminates how socially constructed gender norms have created a system that encourages women to continue to carry the 'double burden' of care services. The 'double burden' structure has contributed tremendously to the economic vulnerability of women, as women in financial crises are more likely to be poor, unemployed, ill in health, and uneducated. Women often suffer more during financial crises because they tend to be more generally disadvantaged than men.

Double burden 

A double burden, otherwise known as a double day, is the phenomenon that a woman holds a paying job in the labor market and then must come home and work a full day's worth of unpaid domestic work within the home. Due to societal norms and expectations, the burden of unpaid work primarily falls on the female in the household even if she and her husband work the same hours in the labor market.

Effect on women 
Balancing paid and unpaid work obligations is taxing on women. Reports of increased stress levels are not uncommon. In fact, women report higher levels of symptoms related to depression and anxiety, including low life satisfaction and subjective well-being. As women increase their paid work time, they do not achieve a corresponding reduction in their unpaid work hours. Nor have men increased their share of unpaid work at the same rate that women have increased their share of paid work. The Human Development Report of 2015 reports that, in 63 countries, 31 percent of women's time is spent doing unpaid work, as compared to men who dedicate only 10 percent of their time to unpaid work. The double-burden is intensified when women are subjected to poverty and live in communities that lack basic infrastructure. In areas that lack easy access to food and water, household duties are even more time consuming.

Data 
The most commonly used method for measuring unpaid domestic labor is through the collection of time-use surveys. These surveys attempt to evaluate how much time is spent providing different services, such as time spent in the workforce versus time spent on unpaid domestic work, such as cooking. Sarah Gammage conducted time use surveys in Guatemala to measure time spent doing unpaid domestic work within households and between family members. In this study, Gammage found women completed approximately 70% of all unpaid domestic work within a household. Similarly, Debbie Budlenger conducted time use surveys across six countries and found women in each country conducted the majority of the unpaid domestic work each day. The results of her findings are summarized in the chart below: 

In a different time use survey, Liangshu Qi and Xiao-yuan Dong found that, in China men complete an average of 58 minutes of unpaid work a day compared to the 139 minutes of unpaid work a day that women complete.

Time-series data collected by the United Nations Statistics Division from 2000 to 2015 directly support the claim that women undertake more than half of household domestic labor all over the world. The largest discrepancy between female and male time-use is in developing countries. The data was collected through a 24-hour diary and then averaged over seven days across 80 countries. In the top ten are three Scandinavian countries (in order from lowest discrepancy in time-use to highest): Sweden, Norway, Denmark, Netherlands and Finland. Out of all the countries included in the data set, Sweden had the smallest discrepancy between female and male time use with a difference of 3.33 hours out of a full day.

In comparison, Algeria, Tunisia, Mexico, Iraq and Guatemala each had female-to-male time-use discrepancies that exceeded 18+ hours of work per day. For both Mexico and Guatemala, the proportion of domestic work that women do exceeded the number of hours in a day by about three hours. Women possibly had some days when they performed more housework than usual, which may have skewed the average. Mathematically, the average of spending four hours per day seven days a week on domestic household labor equates to 672 hours per week or 28 hours per week as an approximation.

Examining only male participation in domestic household labor, the latest data available for Malawi shows that the amount of housework that men do per day is approximately 1.25 hours, and that is the same length of time that Cambodian men spent on household labor in 2004. Other nations with poor male participation in the division of household labor include Pakistan (males:1.81; 18.06 hours discrepancy), Mali (males: 2.50; 17.92 hours discrepancy), Japan (males: 2.92; 12.01 discrepancy) and Palestine (males: 3.06; 16.11 hours discrepancy).

On the other hand, the minimum number of hours that women spend on average occupied by domestic tasks 8.68 hours per week in Malawi. In the United States, the latest available data from 2014 shows that women undertake 14.58 hours per week on household labor. The trend in the division of household domestic labor in countries that have more than one year's worth of data show that, for 14 out of the 35 countries and between a range of 0.99 to 12.99 hours, women's proportion of unpaid labor on average diminished.

Gender and unpaid work: the gender division 
Socially constructed gender roles are prescribed as ideal or proper behaviors for specific categories of male and female. Societies have socially constructed women's roles because women are primarily financially dependent on men as is defined through a 'sexual contract', thus deeming them a "private responsibility of individual men". This construction has resulted in women being domesticated because their primary access to economic support was through marriage to a man. This gender division has made women's needs and rights invisible, which allows men to "continue to dominate women and define them as dependent" and conceals the needed dependency between men and women. This ignored 'dual dependency' highlights the fact that men are dependent on women's "domestic and reproductive labor" just as women are dependent on the income of men.

In many societies the socially constructed role of women includes "giving birth, caring for children, the elderly, and disabled, preparing food and clothing and collecting water, and firework, among others". Furthermore, women's gender roles are socially constructed within the economy as well, because their economic contributions can be easily replaced for men through remarriage or by paying for care services; care work can be bought and sold, but the vast majority of care work is unpaid and is not formally accounted for. The socially constructed gender roles of men being the breadwinners who women depend on and women as members of the domestic sphere have thus been reinforced through economic motives that pose gender relations between men and women as an exchange of support for service. This configuration is based on 'patriarchal control', which is proclaimed to be linked to the "socialization processes where women are raised to be relational" care takers and family structure supports, while men are more 'individualistic' since their role is only tied to providing money. In other words, men provide the money and women are to provide 'unpaid labor'. Consequently, in the field of "unpaid care work" men typically take on far less responsibility than women due to the socially constructed 'gender division of labor' which assigns the obligation of 'caring labor' to women.

Effects

The disproportionate division of household unpaid labor that falls on women negatively impacts their ability to navigate life outside their homes. Their undertaking of unpaid labor is a barrier to entry into the paid employment sector or in the case of those women who enter paid labor they still are left with a "double-burden" of labor.

The UNDP Women and Development Report of 1995 conducted a time-use study that analyzed the amount of time women and men spend on paid and unpaid household and community work in thirty-one countries across the world, including countries classified as 'industrial, 'developing' and 'transition economies.' They found that in almost every country studied women worked longer hours than men but received fewer economic rewards. The study found that in both the 'developing' and 'industrialized world', men received the "lion's share of income and recognition" for their economic inputs, while women's work remained "unpaid, unrecognized, and undervalued." Moreover, in the case of paid and unpaid work hours, the study concluded that within 'industrial countries' women spent "two-thirds" of their total work burden on unpaid activities and "one-third on paid activities" (shares were reversed for men), while in 'developing' countries women spent "two-thirds" of their total work on unpaid labor but "less than one-quarter of the men's" total work was spent on unpaid labor. Additionally, scholar Ruth Pearson argues that women in developing countries tend to shoulder a majority of the unpaid work due to the fact that men refuse to undertake "women's work" because "women as a gender have obligations of others that men as a gender do not bear." The uneven distribution of unpaid care labor amongst the sexes is thus demonstrated globally, although particularly in developing countries such as Nigeria and Ecuador, where women redistribute increased unpaid care labor to females from extended family instead of procuring male participation.

Effects of unpaid domestic work on women 

Time use surveys show that women spend far more time doing unpaid work than men. With women spending more time providing unpaid domestic work than men, women are also spending less time in the workforce and, therefore, bringing in lower incomes to the household. Because women are traditionally believed to bring in less income than men, women are discouraged from investing in education and skills. This further entrenches women into domestic unpaid work, creating a cycle of social norms that is difficult to break and exacerbates gender inequality.

This form of gender inequality feeds into the dynamic of 'gender risks', which explains why it is women and girls that are most disadvantaged, as well as why it is more likely for increased poverty to affect women more than men.

Even if women do enter the workforce, they are usually still held accountable for the majority of the domestic unpaid work at home. This phenomenon of having to work a full day in the workforce and then come home and complete a full day of unpaid domestic work is known as the double burden. The double burden negatively affects women because it gives them less time to spend in the workforce, resulting in men dedicating more time to the workforce, and, therefore, likely getting promoted over women. The double burden also negatively affects women's personal wellbeing because it means women have less time for taking care of themselves and sleeping. This can also negatively affect their job performance in the workforce, encouraging male promotion over female.

Effects of unpaid domestic work on children 
Statistics show that many children, particularly in poorer countries and households, are forced to contribute to the unpaid domestic work of a household. Because unpaid domestic work is traditionally the role of women in many societies, the burden of unpaid domestic work falls particularly on young girls who are forced to drop out of school to assist with the unpaid work within their households.

Effects of unpaid domestic work on the economy 
Some economists argue that unpaid domestic work should be included as economic contributions. The economic value of women's unpaid labor is not included in gross domestic product (GDP) or national income accounting indicators. For this reason, the invisibility of women's work makes analyzing the relationship between households and labor markets difficult. In addition, measures of economic output are largely inaccurate. if unpaid work were incorporated when measuring GDP, it would have raised the GDP by 26 percent in 2010.

Unpaid work contributes to the economy by producing important goods and services such as meals and cleanliness of the home. This allows other household members, as well as the women who deal with the double burden (considering the fact that they need care labor to survive, too), to enter the workforce and contribute to the overall economy via paying jobs. For this reason, Indira Hirway argues that unpaid domestic work should be considered economic production rather than consumption. Hirway also notes that unpaid domestic work has the attributes of a standard economic good because it is neither free nor unlimited.

Unpaid work also affects the labor supply of the economy because fewer women are entering into the workforce due to their domestic unpaid work duties.

Effects of unpaid domestic work on the state 
Unpaid domestic work has a positive effect on a state's budget. Unpaid domestic work is typically the type of work that a state would provide for its citizens if family members were not already providing for their family. This includes things like child care, elder care, medical care, and nutrition. Because these things are being provided by an unpaid domestic worker, the state does not need to expend resources to provide its citizens with these services. Therefore, unpaid domestic work can decrease the amount of money a state must spend to otherwise provide these services. Note, however, that when a state cuts care services for the young, elderly, sick and disabled, the burden of this care is generally placed on female family members, meaning decreases in a state's spending on care can have a negative effect on female participation in the workforce.

As noted by Aslanbeigui and Summerfield, when cuts to social expenditures are experienced women and children suffer the most, particularly during financial crises. They argue that cuts to healthcare, education and income disadvantage women in the long-term and push them further into poverty and therefore more reliant on the state.

Relationship to the economy and the paid labor market 
Unpaid care labor is necessary to maintain order in our global market economy. According to Henderson's Cake Model, reproductive labor and care labor are "key to the functioning of all economies."

Care labor maintains the well-being, and thereby fosters the productivity, of those who are performing paid work. Productivity—along with its ability to be used for personal gain by individuals within the system—is used to produce capital. There are two types of capital: financial capital, which maintains the world's Capitalist practices by placing monetary value on everything that can be deemed "valuable," and human capital, which is "the skills, knowledge, and experience possessed by an individual or population, viewed in terms of their value or cost to an organization or country;" economists consider "expenditures on education, training, medical care, and so on as investments in human capital" because they foster health and well-being in those who work towards producing financial capital. Human capital, however, is typically valued less than financial capital because the labor done to contribute to human capital is heavily feminized.

Since it has become increasingly necessary for more than one individual in a household to join the paid labor force, care labor (especially cooking, cleaning, and child-rearing in the forms of chefs, maids/cleaning staffs, and day-care workers) has become marketized. "Workers in [care] sectors are often among the most exploited, receiving low pay and working under precarious conditions."

Valuation  
There are three ways to measure the value of unpaid domestic work: the opportunity cost method, the replacement cost method, and the input/out cost method.

Opportunity cost method 
The opportunity cost method measures the value of unpaid domestic work by calculating the amount of money unpaid domestic workers could be making if instead of doing unpaid work they were working in the labor market. For example, if a former female attorney is now a stay-at-home mother conducting unpaid domestic work, the value of an hour of unpaid domestic work is the hourly rate she could make if she were working as an attorney. The major flaw with this method is that two unpaid domestic workers can do the same job at the same proficiency level, but the value of the work will fluctuate based on the workers' prior education and skill level. It is also a problem for women who never held a job, because it is unclear how much money they would be making if they were participating in the work force, rather than working unpaid at home.

Market replacement cost method 
The replacement cost method measures the value of unpaid domestic work by calculating the monetary cost of purchasing that service instead. For example, to value unpaid child care, look at the cost of hiring a nanny, or to value the cost of cooking a meal, look at the cost of eating a similar meal at a restaurant. The flaw with this method is that it cannot account for the added sentimental value of having a mother stay at home with her children rather than a stranger.

Input/output cost method 
The input/output cost method measures the value of unpaid domestic work by calculating the monetary value of the economic goods and services produced by unpaid domestic work and how much these goods and services would sell for in the open market.

Policy solutions 
Dynamic policy solutions that emphasize the value of unpaid labor contributions at the macro level and redistribute unpaid labor within households are essential for gender equality. The following section outlines potential policy solutions that have been put forth by other academics.

Requiring data collection at the national and state level The quality and availability of data at the micro and macro levels is an area in need of improvement for the purpose of studying how policies impact the division of labor within households and for calculating the value unpaid labor. Organizations, such as the United Nations Statistics Division, capture quantitative data on the number of hours women and men spend on paid, unpaid and total work hours. Collecting more qualitative data would be additionally useful for determining how to calculate the value unpaid labor, particularly for the market replacement cost method.

Investment into public infrastructure  Policies aimed at channeling public funds towards investment projects that create more efficient accessibility to resources are essential for lessening the burden of unpaid labor, particularly in developing countries. As noted by Koolwal and van de Walle (2013), women in rural and developing countries spend a considerable amount of time collecting water. In their study which look at countries in the Middle East, North Africa, Sub-Saharan Africa and Southeast Asia they found that when access to water increased as a result of infrastructure investment women didn't enter into more paid employment, but their overall time spent on unpaid labor did diminish.

Subsidized child, elder and care services The state's role in providing quality affordable care services should not be overlooked. Since free childcare would be ineffective at generating income for workers, the services need to be subsidized to ensure that workers are compensated for their labor and that families can afford to use their services. The United Nations Sustainable Development Goal 5 also advocates for the provision of public service, infrastructure, and social protection policies in  recognition of unpaid work.

Subsidized energy (non-reliant on fossil fuels) To reduce the amount of time spent collecting fuel for household energy demands, central governments and states should sponsor renewable energy sources for the purpose of reducing the amount of time women spend of fetching fuelwood. In addition, an alternative is investing in biogas production which is a better alternative to standard forms of household fuel given that it is pollution-free leading to a reduction in indoor air pollution that will benefit all members of a household.

Family-friendly workplace policies Shortened work weeks, flexible paid leave, flextime, and remote work are possible solutions that would facilitate the redistribution of unpaid labor within households. In Nancy Fraser's article, "After the Family Wage: Gender Equity and the Welfare State" from 1994, she suggests that in two partner households a reduced work week is the most efficient vehicle for assuring gender equality. At the same time, it's essential that policy makers are aware of household dynamics that aren't limited to dual income earning households to ensure that single parents aren't left more vulnerable economically.

See also
 Care work 
 Child care
 Double burden 
 Feminist economics
 Housewife 
 Human capital
 Universal basic income

References

 
Volunteering
Slavery
Labour law